Fray Bartolomé de Selma y Salaverde (c. 1595, in Cuenca 
– after 1638) was a Spanish Baroque composer and virtuoso player of the dulcian, a predecessor to the modern bassoon. He was an Augustinian friar who was employed at the archducal court at Innsbruck from 1628 to 1630, and was the son, or possibly grandson, of Bartolome de Selma (d. 1616), luthier to the Spanish royal chapel.
His compositions include the Primo libro de canzoni, fantasie & correnti (Venice, 1638), and manuscript vocal works.

Works
Selected works include:

Primo libro de canzoni, fantasie & correnti (1638)Canzona a 4 sopra battaglia''

References

Spanish Baroque composers
Renaissance composers
1590s births
17th-century deaths
Spanish classical bassoonists
Spanish male classical composers
17th-century classical composers
17th-century male musicians